Antygomonas paulae is a species of Antygomonas found in the Atlantic.

References

Kinorhyncha
Animals described in 2007